Lyndon Ferns (born 24 September 1983 in Pietersburg, South Africa) is a retired Olympic gold-medalist and former world record swimmer from South Africa. He swam for South Africa at the 2004 and 2008 Olympics.

At the 2004 Olympics, he was a member of South Africa's Men's 4×100 m freestyle relay that won the event in a world record. Three of the team were a part of the relay that broke the record and won gold at the 2006 Commonwealth Games.

During the 2007 World Championships held in Melbourne, Australia, Lyndon became the first man out of Africa to complete the 100m butterfly in under 52 seconds, touching the wall in 51.90 seconds and with that breaking his own African record. He was also part of the 4 × 100 m freestyle and 4 × 100 m medley relay, both placing fourth.

Lyndon also competed at the 2008 Beijing Olympic Games, where he set the African record in the 100m freestyle at 48.00, earning a sixth place in the finals. He also competed in the 100m butterfly, 4 × 100 m freestyle relay and 4 × 100 m medley relay.

In May 2009, it was announced that he was part of South Africa's team to the 2009 World Championships. At the 2009 World Championships, Lyndon became the first male athlete from Africa, to complete the 100m freestyle in under 48 seconds, setting the African record at 47.79 seconds. He is still the only man from Africa to have completed the 100m freestyle in a sub 48 second swim.
He is the holder of the following records:
(Updated July 2014)
 African records: 100 m freestyle, 4×100 m freestyle relay
 South African records: 100 m freestyle, 4×100 m Freestyle relay

In April 2011, Lyndon retired from competitive swimming.

College
He attended the University of Arizona, where he competed at the NCAA level for his four years of eligibility under the tutelage of former-Olympian, world-renowned sprint coach, Rick DeMont. Lyndon completed his eligibility as a 24-time All-American, NCAA record holder, 3-time relay national champion as well as national champion in the 100y butterfly. Lyndon now lives in South Africa.

Personal bests

Affiliations
 TuksSport – University of Pretoria, South Africa
 Northern Tigers
 University of Arizona, USA

See also
 List of Commonwealth Games medallists in swimming (men)
 List of Olympic medalists in swimming (men)
 World record progression 4 × 100 metres freestyle relay

References

External links
 Retirement news article Sport24

1983 births
Living people
People from Polokwane
South African male swimmers
White South African people
Arizona Wildcats men's swimmers
Olympic swimmers of South Africa
Swimmers at the 2004 Summer Olympics
Swimmers at the 2008 Summer Olympics
Olympic gold medalists for South Africa
Swimmers at the 2006 Commonwealth Games
University of Pretoria alumni
World record setters in swimming
South African male freestyle swimmers
South African people of British descent
Medalists at the 2004 Summer Olympics
Commonwealth Games gold medallists for South Africa
Olympic gold medalists in swimming
Commonwealth Games medallists in swimming
Sportspeople from Limpopo
Medallists at the 2006 Commonwealth Games